Ursula Franklin Academy (colloquially known as UFA; pronounced as oo-faa) is a public high school in Toronto, Ontario, Canada. Located in the High Park neighbourhood, it was owned by the Toronto Board of Education until its merger into the Toronto District School Board. Originally located in the Dufferin-Bloor area at 90 Croatia Street, UFA moved in 2002 to share a building with Western Technical-Commercial School and The Student School. UFA has no feeder schools and as a result, students attend UFA from a variety of middle schools in Toronto; students generally attend after applying and winning a space secured through a competitive lottery system. Founded in 1995, Ursula Franklin Academy's style of teaching is a doctrine of Dr. Ursula Franklin's work in the field of education. It was the Toronto Board of Education's first school to require students to wear uniforms.

History

A think tank created the concept of the school.

Ursula Franklin Academy opened in the fall of 1995 in the former Brockton High School, which originally was built and named in 1966. The Toronto Board of Education (TBE) planned it as a traditional academic school that had focus on languages, mathematics, science, and technology. John Doherty, a trustee in the TBE, said that "We're not trying to create a magnet school or an elite school that has waiting lists and so on. We want it serving the local community." Ursula Franklin Academy moved into Western Technical-Commercial School in September 2002.

Notable Alumni
Kosi Thompson

See also

List of high schools in Ontario

References

External links
 Ursula Franklin Academy
 TDSB Profile

Educational institutions established in 1995
High schools in Toronto
Schools in the TDSB
1995 establishments in Ontario